Llandybie RFC is a Welsh rugby union team based in the village of Llandybie, which is located 2.5 miles north of Ammanford in the county of Carmarthenshire. Llandybie RFC is a member of the Welsh Rugby Union and is a feeder club for the Llanelli-based professional team Scarlets. Llandybie RFC play in Division Three West B of the SWALEC National League.

Club captain is Keenan Jones.

References 

Welsh rugby union teams
Sport in Carmarthenshire